Peter Campbell (29 April 1875 – 14 September 1948) was an Australian rules footballer who played with Carlton in the Victorian Football League (VFL).

Family
The son of Charles Campbell (1835-1881), and Anna Campbell, née Lippiatt, Peter Campbell was born on 29 April 1875.

Football
Recruited from Parkville Junior in 1900, Campbell played 3 games for Carlton: two at full-forward (he kicked 1 goal in two matches), and one at full-back.

Death
He died at "Bower Cottages" in the Adelaide suburb of Davington (now part of Semaphore Park) on 14 September 1948.

Notes

External links 

Peter Campbell's profile at Blueseum

1875 births
1948 deaths
Australian rules footballers from Victoria (Australia)
Carlton Football Club players